Cut Lunch is a mini-album or EP by Australian new wave band Models, originally released on 10" vinyl by Mushroom Records in June 1981.

The collection started off as demo recordings, which proved successful enough to release just before the group went to England to record their second album proper, Local and/or General. One track, "Man o' Action", was re-recorded for that album. Cut Lunch is generally regarded as the Models' release which is the most influenced by post-punk and dub, and least by conventional pop music. Apart from "Atlantic Romantic", which had been a live favourite of the group for a number of years, the songs were freshly composed: their lyrics were difficult to understand, and remain confusing even now. "Atlantic Romantic" was co-produced by Eddie Rayner of Split Enz fame.

A seven-and-a-half minute promotional music video was released for the mini-album, which combined videos for brief excerpts of each of the tracks (including a crude home-made claymation video for "Germ") with vox pop interviews conducted by the band members in the streets of Melbourne. No single was released, although "Two Cabs to the Toucan" was promoted on Countdown. Cut Lunch peaked at #37 in the Australian albums charts and at #38 on the singles charts. "Cut Lunch", the title track, and "Two Cabs to the Toucan" were the most played tracks on radio.

Track listing

Personnel

Musicians
 Andrew Duffield – keyboards
 Mark Ferrie – bass guitar
 Sean Kelly – guitar, clarinet, vocals
 Buster Stiggs – drums

Production 
 Producer – Tony Cohen 
 Producer – Eddie Rayner ("Atlantic Romantic")
 Producer – Models

References

1981 EPs
Models (band) albums
Albums produced by Tony Cohen
Mushroom Records albums